Heptanol may refer to any of four isomeric chemical compounds:
 1-Heptanol, an alcohol with a seven carbon chain and the structural formula of CH3(CH2)6OH
 2-Heptanol, a secondary alcohol with the hydroxyl on the second carbon of the straight seven-carbon chain
 3-Heptanol, an organic alcohol with the chemical formula C7H16O

See also 
 C7H16O

Fatty alcohols
Alkanols